Champion Industries is an American commercial printing company based in Huntington, West Virginia. The company was founded in 1964 and has grown throughout the southeastern United States.  The largest stockholder, Chairman of the Board and CEO is Marshall Reynolds.

The company owns commercial printing operations in North Carolina, Pennsylvania, Ohio, Tennessee, West Virginia, Indiana and Louisiana and office equipment concerns in West Virginia, Kentucky, and Ohio.  It also prints ad inserts for numerous newspapers.

On May 22, 2009 the company defaulted on a 70 million dollar loan used to purchase the Herald-Dispatch and eliminated about 15% of the newspaper's workforce.

References

External links
Official site
Forbes.com profile

Companies based in West Virginia
Huntington, West Virginia